The 2021–22 UEFA Europa League was the 51st season of Europe's secondary club football tournament organised by UEFA, and the 13th season since it was renamed from the UEFA Cup to the UEFA Europa League.

Eintracht Frankfurt defeated Rangers in the final played at the Ramón Sánchez Pizjuán in Seville, Spain, 5–4 on penalties following a 1–1 draw after extra time, winning the competition for the second time in club history, and the first since 1980. The final was originally scheduled to be played at the Puskás Aréna in Budapest, Hungary. However, due to the postponement and relocation of the 2020 final, the final hosts were shifted back a year, with Budapest instead hosting the 2023 final. As winners, Eintracht Frankfurt automatically qualified for the 2022–23 UEFA Champions League group stage, and also earned the right to play against the winners of the 2021–22 UEFA Champions League, Real Madrid, in the 2022 UEFA Super Cup.

This season was the first since 1999–2000 (the first season after the dissolution of the UEFA Cup Winners' Cup) where three major European club competitions (UEFA Champions League, UEFA Europa League, and the newly created UEFA Europa Conference League) take place, and the first outright where the Europa League (then the UEFA Cup) is the secondary competition of the three. As a result, major changes to the format of the Europa League were made. The number of teams in the group stage was reduced from 48 to 32 teams, and the number of teams participating in qualifying was also reduced significantly. The first round of the knockout phase also now involved only the group stage runners-up and the Champions League third-placed teams, with the group winners directly advancing to the round of 16.

As the title holders Villarreal qualified for the 2021–22 UEFA Champions League, they were unable to defend their title as they advanced to the Champions League knockout stage, and were eliminated by Liverpool in the semi-finals.

On 24 June 2021, UEFA approved the proposal to abolish the away goals rule in all UEFA club competitions, which had been used since 1965. Therefore, if in a two-legged tie, two teams scored the same number of aggregate goals, the winner of tie was not decided by the number of away goals scored by each team, but always by 30 minutes of extra time, and if the two teams scored the same number of goals in extra time, the winner was decided by a penalty shoot-out.

Association team allocation
A total of 58 teams from 33 of the 55 UEFA member associations participated in the 2021–22 UEFA Europa League. Among them, 16 associations had teams directly qualifying for the Europa League, while for the other 39 associations that did not have any teams directly qualifying, 17 of them had teams playing after being transferred from the Champions League (the only member association which could not have a participant was Liechtenstein, which did not organise a domestic league, and could only enter their cup winner into the Europa Conference League given their association ranking). The association ranking based on the UEFA country coefficients was used to determine the number of participating teams for each association:
Associations 1–5 each had two teams qualify.
Associations 6–15 each had one team qualify.
As the UEFA Europa Conference League title holders' berth was not used this season, association 16 had one of their teams promoted from the Europa Conference League to the Europa League, so they also had one team qualify.
Moreover, 37 teams eliminated from the 2021–22 UEFA Champions League were transferred to the Europa League.
In future seasons, the title holders of the UEFA Europa Conference League would be given an additional entry in the Europa League. However, this berth was not used for this season as the first edition of the UEFA Europa Conference League had not been held.

Association ranking
For the 2021–22 UEFA Europa League, the associations were allocated places according to their 2020 UEFA country coefficients, which took into account their performance in European competitions from 2015–16 to 2019–20.

Apart from the allocation based on the country coefficients, associations could have additional teams participating in the Europa League, as noted below:
 – Additional teams transferred from the UEFA Champions League

Distribution
The following is the access list for this season. In the default access list, the title holders of the Europa Conference League qualified for the group stage. However, since this berth was not used for this season, the following changes to the access list were made:
The cup winners of association 7 (Russia) enter the group stage instead of the play-off round.
The cup winners of association 13 (Denmark) enter the play-off round instead of the third qualifying round.
The cup winners of association 16 (Cyprus) enter the third qualifying round instead of the Europa Conference League.

Teams

The labels in the parentheses show how each team qualified for the place of its starting round:
CW: Cup winners
4th, 5th, etc.: League position of the previous season

UCL: Transferred from the Champions League
GS: Third-placed teams from the group stage
CH/LP PO: Losers from the play-off round (Champions/League Path)
CH/LP Q3: Losers from the third qualifying round (Champions/League Path)
CH/LP Q2: Losers from the second qualifying round (Champions/League Path)

The third qualifying round was divided into Champions Path (CH) and Main Path (MP).

CC: 2021 UEFA club coefficients.

Schedule
The schedule of the competition was as follows. Matches were scheduled for Thursdays apart from the final, which took place on a Wednesday, though exceptionally could take place on Tuesdays or Wednesdays due to scheduling conflicts. Scheduled kick-off times starting from the group stage were 18:45 (instead of 18:55 previously) and 21:00 CEST/CET, though exceptionally could take place at 16:30 due to geographical reasons.

All draws started at 13:00 or 13:30 CEST/CET and were held at the UEFA headquarters in Nyon, Switzerland. On 16 July 2021, UEFA announced that the group stage draw would be held in Istanbul, Turkey.

Third qualifying round

Play-off round

Group stage

The draw for the group stage was held on 27 August 2021, 12:00 CEST (13:00 TRT), in Istanbul, Turkey. The 32 teams were drawn into eight groups of four. For the draw, the teams were seeded into four pots, each of eight teams, based on their 2021 UEFA club coefficients. Teams from the same association could not be drawn into the same group. Prior to the draw, UEFA formed pairings of teams from the same association, including those playing in the Europa Conference League group stage (one pairing for associations with two or three teams, two pairings for associations with four or five teams), based on television audiences, where one team was drawn into Groups A–D and another team was drawn into Groups E–H, so that the two teams would have different kick-off times.

The matches were played on 15–16 September, 30 September, 19–21 October, 4 November, 24–25 November, and 9 December 2021. The winners of each group advanced to the round of 16, while the runners-up advanced to the knockout round play-offs. The third-placed teams were transferred to the Europa Conference League knockout round play-offs, while the fourth-placed teams were eliminated from European competitions for the season.

Brøndby and West Ham United made their debut appearances in the Europa League group stage (although Brøndby had previously appeared in the UEFA Cup group stage).

Group A

Group B

Group C

Group D

Group E

Group F

Group G

Group H

Knockout phase

In the knockout phase, teams played against each other over two legs on a home-and-away basis, except for the one-match final.

Bracket

Knockout round play-offs

Round of 16

Quarter-finals

Semi-finals

Final

Statistics
Statistics exclude qualifying round and play-off round.

Top goalscorers

Notes

Top assists

Team of the season
The UEFA technical study group selected the following players as the team of the tournament.

Player of the Season
  Filip Kostić ( Eintracht Frankfurt)

Young Player of the Season
  Ansgar Knauff ( Eintracht Frankfurt)

See also
2021–22 UEFA Champions League
2021–22 UEFA Europa Conference League
2022 UEFA Super Cup
2021–22 UEFA Women's Champions League
2021–22 UEFA Youth League

References

External links

 
1
2021-22
Sports events affected by the 2022 Russian invasion of Ukraine